Dimetindene , also sold under the brand name  Fenistil, is an antihistamine/anticholinergic. It is a first generation selective H1 antagonist. Dimetindene is an atypical first generation H1 antagonist as it only minimally passes across the blood–brain barrier.

Dimetindene is also an M2 receptor antagonist.

It was patented in 1958 and came into medical use in 1960.

Medical use 
Dimetindene is used orally and topically as an antipruritic.  It is used topically to treat skin irritations, such as insect bites. Dimetindene is also administered orally to treat allergies, such as hay fever.

It is commonly formulated as its maleic acid salt, dimethindene maleate.

Names
It is sold under the brand name Fenistil among others.

References 

H1 receptor antagonists
Indenes
Muscarinic antagonists
2-Pyridyl compounds